Sinan Çetin (born 1 March 1953) is a Turkish film director, actor, and producer. He won the best director award at the 12th Dhaka International Film Festival.

Çetin was born as one of the eight children of a customs officer. He is of maternal Azeri and paternal Georgian descent. He studied art history at Hacettepe University. Çetin has produced full-length films and television series, and foremost, commercials. He is best known in the English-speaking world for his 1999 film Propaganda, a critically acclaimed libertarian comedy about post-World War II eastern Turkey. Çetin both directed and produced this film, as he did for many other films. His 1993 film Berlin in Berlin was entered into the 18th Moscow International Film Festival.

Çetin is a fan of Ayn Rand, and has published Rand's books and other libertarian books in Turkey.

Çetin manages and owns the film production company Plato Film Productions. He opened the company in 1986 and it has been expanding ever since. It is one of the most commercially successful Production Companies in Turkey. He is currently working on his 13th feature film named Çanakkale Çocukları. The film will star actors such as Haluk Bilginer, Oktay Kaynarca, Yavuz Bingöl, and Sinan Çetin's two sons Rafael Cemo Çetin and Orfeo Çetin.

Filmography

Films
 1982 - Çiçek Abbas (director)
 1982 - Çirkinler de Sever (director)
 1985 - 14 Numara (director)
 1986 - Prenses Gökyüzü (director)
 1993 - Berlin in Berlin (director)
 1995 - Bay E (director)
 1999 - Propaganda (director)
 2001 - Komser Şekspir (director)
 2002 - Banka (director)
 2004 - Okul (producer)
 2004 - Romantik (director)
 2005 - Pardon (producer)
 2005 - Şans Kapıyı Kırınca (actor)
 2008 - Mutlu Ol! Bu bir emirdir (writer & director)
 2010 - Kağıt (director)

Television
 2004 - Avrupa Yakası 2006 - Sahte PrensesDocumentary
 1977 - Baskın 1977 - Halı TürküsüReferences

External links
 
 Her 10 yılda bir başka Sinan Çetin, Asu Maro, 23 January 2008, Milliyet'' 
 Biyografi.info - Biography of Sinan Çetin 

1953 births
Turkish people of Azerbaijani descent
Turkish people of Georgian descent
People from Bahçesaray (district)
Hacettepe University alumni
Turkish former Muslims
Turkish atheists
Turkish film directors
Turkish film producers
Turkish publishers (people)
Objectivists
Best Director Golden Orange Award winners
Living people